Khajpur is a village in Jhajjar district on Jhajjar- Kosli road at  and after that at 

Geography of Haryana